Anita Dolly Haubenstock Panek is a Brazilian biochemist. She emigrated from Poland to Brazil because of World War II. She received a B.Sc. in Chemistry, 1954 and a Ph.D. in 1962. She became a professor at the Universidade Federal do Rio de Janeiro.

In 1988 she showed that endogenous trehalose protects cells against the damage caused by freezing.

Memberships
Brazilian Academy of Sciences, Rio de Janeiro, Brazil, 1986.
Latin American Academy of Sciences, Caracas, Venezuela, 1989.
Third World Academy of Sciences, 1989.

Awards
Commander of the National Order of Scientific Merit, Brazil, 1996.

References

External links
Anita Dolly Panek

Brazilian scientists
Living people
Polish biochemists
Polish women chemists
Commanders of the National Order of Scientific Merit (Brazil)
Brazilian people of Polish-Jewish descent
Brazilian women scientists
Polish women scientists
Women biochemists
20th-century women scientists
Polish women academics
20th-century Polish scientists
Year of birth missing (living people)
20th-century Polish women
Polish emigrants to Brazil